The Didon was a 60-gun  first rank frigate of the French Navy.

Career 
Didon took part in the Invasion of Algiers in 1830, and in the Battle of the Tagus the next year.

Didon ran aground on the south coast of Saint Croix on 25 May 1836 and lost her rudder. Although refloated, she ran aground a second time before being taken in to Frederickstadt.  She later took part in the Crimean War as a troopship.

References

Age of Sail frigates of France
Frigates of the French Navy
Dryade-class frigates
1828 ships
Maritime incidents in May 1836